Terrell rotation or Terrell effect is the visual distortion that a passing object would appear to undergo, according to the special theory of relativity if it were travelling at a significant fraction of the speed of light. This behaviour was described independently by both Roger Penrose and James Terrell. Penrose's article was submitted 29 July 1958 and published in January 1959. Terrell's article was submitted 22 June 1959 and published 15 November 1959. The general phenomenon was noted already in 1924 by Austrian physicist Anton Lampa.

This phenomenon was popularized by Victor Weisskopf in a Physics Today article.

Due to an early dispute about priority and correct attribution, the effect is also sometimes referred to as the Penrose–Terrell effect, the Terrell–Penrose effect or the Lampa–Terrell–Penrose effect, but not the Lampa effect.

Further detail

Terrell's and Penrose's papers pointed out that although special relativity appeared to describe an "observed contraction" in moving objects, these interpreted "observations" were not to be confused with the theory's literal predictions for the visible appearance of a moving object. Thanks to the differential timelag effects in signals reaching the observer from the object's different parts, a receding object would appear contracted, an approaching object would appear elongated (even under special relativity) and the geometry of a passing object would appear skewed, as if rotated. By R.Penrose: "the light from the trailing part reaches the observer from behind the sphere, which it can do since the sphere is continuously moving out of its way".

For images of passing objects, the apparent contraction of distances between points on the object's transverse surface could then be interpreted as being due to an apparent change in viewing angle, and the image of the object could be interpreted as appearing instead to be rotated. A previously popular description of special relativity's predictions, in which an observer sees a passing object to be contracted (for instance, from a sphere to a flattened ellipsoid), was wrong. A sphere maintains its circular outline since, as the sphere moves, light from further points of the Lorentz-contracted ellipsoid takes longer to reach the eye.

Terrell's and Penrose's papers prompted a number of follow-up papers, mostly in the American Journal of Physics, exploring the consequences of this correction. These papers pointed out that some existing discussions of special relativity were flawed and "explained" effects that the theory did not actually predict – while these papers did not change the actual mathematical structure of special relativity in any way, they did correct a misconception regarding the theory's predictions.

A representation of the Terrell effect can be seen in the physics simulator "A Slower Speed of Light," published by MIT.

See also
Length contraction
Stellar aberration

References and further reading

External links
A webpage explaining the Penrose-Terrell Effect
An animation demonstrating the effect
Extensive explanations and visualizations of the appearance of moving objects

Special relativity